The 2013 Yeongwol Challenger Tennis was a professional tennis tournament played on carpet courts. It was the 1st edition of the tournament which was part of the 2013 ATP Challenger Tour. It took place in Yeongwol, South Korea between November 4 and 10, 2013.

Singles main-draw entrants

Seeds

 1 Rankings are as of October 28, 2013.

Other entrants
The following players received wildcards into the singles main draw:
  Chung Hong
  Chung Hyeon
  Jeong Suk-young
  Nam Ji-sung

The following players used special exempt into the singles main draw:
  Brydan Klein

The following players used protected ranking into the singles main draw:
  Daniel Kosakowski

The following players received entry from the qualifying draw:
  Marcus Daniell
  Jason Jung
  Daniel Nguyen
  Alexander Ward

Champions

Singles

 Bradley Klahn def.  Taro Daniel 7–6(7–5), 6–2

Doubles

 Marin Draganja /  Mate Pavić def.  Lee Hsin-han /  Peng Hsien-yin 6–4, 4–6, [10–7]

External links
[Official Website]

Yeongwol Challenger Tennis
Yeongwol Challenger Tennis
2013 in South Korean tennis